Iryna Lishchynska, née Nedelenko (Неделенко) (born 15 January 1976 in Makiivka) is a Ukrainian middle-distance athlete who specializes in the 1500 metres.

Achievements

Personal bests
800 metres - 1:59.15 min (1998)
1500 metres - 4:00.04 min (2006)
Mile run - 4:25.32 min (2008) - Ukrainian record.

References

 

1976 births
Living people
Ukrainian female middle-distance runners
Athletes (track and field) at the 2004 Summer Olympics
Athletes (track and field) at the 2008 Summer Olympics
Olympic athletes of Ukraine
Olympic silver medalists for Ukraine
World Athletics Championships medalists
Medalists at the 2008 Summer Olympics
Olympic silver medalists in athletics (track and field)
Universiade medalists in athletics (track and field)
Universiade gold medalists for Ukraine
Competitors at the 2001 Summer Universiade
Medalists at the 1997 Summer Universiade
Sportspeople from Makiivka